The Carmel Indians (pronounced Car'-mul) are a group of Melungeons who moved from Magoffin County, Kentucky and lived in Highland County in Ohio. 

Bryson Gibson and Valentine Collins are ancestors to most of the group. Paternal line descendants of Bryson Gibson and Valentine Collins who participated in the Melungeon DNA Project belong to Haplogroup E-M2. They both lived in Kentucky and many of their descendants later moved to Ohio and were referred to as "Carmel Indians." At one time, anthropologists described both groups as among the "little races" and as tri-racial isolates.

Some members of the group claimed American Indian ancestry. This was one way the people could evade some of the racial barriers of antebellum and post-Civil War years. Outsiders called them Indians to explain aspects of the differences between their appearance and that of their mostly European neighbors. They found an adaptive way to evade some of the racial pressures that intensified in some areas after the Civil War. In the postwar South, there was a binary division of society into black and white races.

As researcher Paul Heinegg (1997) has documented the ancestry of the majority of the Free Negro population can be traced to African Americans free in Virginia before the American Revolution. He has found that most of these free African Americans were mixed-race children of early unions during the colonial period between white women, indentured servant or free, and African men, indentured servant, free, or enslaved. This was before the racial caste had hardened and, on small farms, white and black workers lived near each other and associated. According to the law, children were born into the social status of their mothers, by the principle of partus sequitur ventrem, adopted in the 17th-century Virginia colony. Since the mothers were white and free, their children were free born.

Through the years, some of their descendants continued to marry their cousins of mixed race; some chose passing as White, and others married within African-American identified families.

References

Mulatto
Ethnic groups in Appalachia
Ethnic groups in Ohio
Highland County, Ohio